OGLE2-TR-L9b is an extrasolar planet discovered by three undergraduate students from Leiden University, Netherlands.
The planet is about 4.5 times as massive as Jupiter and is the first discovered planet orbiting a fast-rotating hot star.

Initially discovered while testing a method for investigating light fluctuations in the OGLE database, the planet's existence was later confirmed by follow-up observations from the ESO's Very Large Telescope in Chile.

See also 
 Optical Gravitational Lensing Experiment OGLE
 OGLE-TR-113b
 OGLE-TR-10b
 OGLE-TR-111b
 OGLE-TR-56b

References

External links 

 
 Students Discover Unique Planet
 

Exoplanets discovered in 2008
Giant planets
Hot Jupiters
Transiting exoplanets
Carina (constellation)